In econometrics, extreme bounds analysis is a type of sensitivity analysis which attempts to determine the most extreme possible estimates for a fixed subset of allowed coefficients and a variable set of linear homogeneous restrictions. It was originally developed by Edward E. Leamer in 1983, and subsequently refined by Clive Granger and Harald Uhlig in 1990. It is a more precise method of measuring specification uncertainty than traditional econometrics because it incorporates prior information, and uses a systematic methodology to examine the fragility of coefficients. It allows researchers to obtain upper and lower limits for the parameter of interest for any possible set of explanatory variables.

References

Sensitivity analysis